Little Miss Dangerous is the ninth studio album by American hard rock guitarist Ted Nugent. It was released in March 1986 by Atlantic Records.

The single "Little Miss Dangerous" was Ted Nugent's most successful single in Australia. The track was featured in an episode of the same name of the American television series Miami Vice. The track "Angry Young Man" was also used in an episode of Miami Vice entitled "Definitely Miami", in which Nugent guest-starred as a pimp/drug dealer and was killed in a shoot-out with Sonny Crockett (Don Johnson).

A promotional video clip was produced for the song "Little Miss Dangerous".

Reception 

AllMusic's John Franck was heavily dismissive of Little Miss Dangerous, opining that it may be "the worst Ted Nugent record ever released", and being "a sonic embarrassment" to be "avoid[ed] at all costs".

Track listing
All songs written and arranged by Ted Nugent, except where indicated

Personnel
Band members
 Ted Nugent – guitars, six-string bass, percussion, lead and backing vocals, producer, mixing
 Dave Amato – rhythm guitar, guitar synthesizer, synthesizer, lead and backing vocals

Additional musicians
Patrick Leonard, David 'Hawk' Wolinski, Lawrence Dermer – keyboards and synthesizers
Ricky Phillips – bass, background vocals
Jay Ferguson – bass
Michael Mason – drums and percussion, background vocals
Joe Galdo, Duane Hitchings – keyboards
Rick Baron, Tommy Thayer, Sandy Slavin, Bobby Colomby, Robby Weaver, Jaime St. James, Carmine Appice – background vocals

Production
Peter Solley – producer, engineer, mixing
Michael Verdick – producer, engineer
Jim Sessody – engineer
Patrice Levinsohn – assistant engineer
Doug Banker – executive producer, management, background vocals
Dennis King – mastering
Bob Defrin – art direction
Eric Conn – 2001 edition digital remastering
Gary Graff – 2001 edition liner notes

Charts

Album

Singles

References

1986 albums
Ted Nugent albums
Atlantic Records albums